Nurek can refer to:

 Nurak, a city in Tajikistan
 Nurek Dam, a dam in Tajikistan, or its reservoir
Nurek, Łódź Voivodeship (central Poland)